French (  or  ) is a Romance language of the Indo-European family. It descended from the Vulgar Latin of the Roman Empire, as did all Romance languages. French evolved from Gallo-Romance, the Latin spoken in Gaul, and more specifically in Northern Gaul. Its closest relatives are the other langues d'oïl—languages historically spoken in northern France and in southern Belgium, which French (Francien) largely supplanted. French was also influenced by native Celtic languages of Northern Roman Gaul like Gallia Belgica and by the (Germanic) Frankish language of the post-Roman Frankish invaders. Today, owing to France's past overseas expansion, there are numerous French-based creole languages, most notably Haitian Creole. A French-speaking person or nation may be referred to as Francophone in both English and French.

French is an official language in 29 countries across multiple continents, most of which are members of the Organisation internationale de la Francophonie (OIF), the community of 84 countries which share the official use or teaching of French. French is also one of six official languages used in the United Nations. It is spoken as a first language (in descending order of the number of speakers) in France; Canada (especially in the provinces of Quebec, Ontario, and New Brunswick, as well as other Francophone regions); Belgium (Wallonia and the Brussels-Capital Region); western Switzerland (specifically the cantons forming the Romandy region); parts of Luxembourg; parts of the United States (the states of Louisiana, Maine, New Hampshire and Vermont); Monaco; the Aosta Valley region of Italy; and various communities elsewhere.

In 2015, approximately 40% of the francophone population (including L2 and partial speakers) lived in Europe, 36% in sub-Saharan Africa and the Indian Ocean, 15% in North Africa and the Middle East, 8% in the Americas, and 1% in Asia and Oceania. French is the second-most widely spoken mother tongue in the European Union. Of Europeans who speak other languages natively, approximately one-fifth are able to speak French as a second language. French is the second-most taught foreign language in the EU. All institutions of the EU use French as a working language along with English and German; in certain institutions, French is the sole working language (e.g. at the Court of Justice of the European Union). French is also the 18th most natively spoken language in the world, fifth most spoken language by total number of speakers and the second or third most studied language worldwide (with about 120 million learners as of 2017). As a result of French and Belgian colonialism from the 16th century onward, French was introduced to new territories in the Americas, Africa and Asia. Most second-language speakers reside in Francophone Africa, in particular Gabon, Algeria, Morocco, Tunisia, Mauritius, Senegal and Ivory Coast.

French is estimated to have about 76 million native speakers; about 235 million daily, fluent speakers; and another 77–110 million secondary speakers who speak it as a second language to varying degrees of proficiency, mainly in Africa. According to the OIF, approximately 321 million people worldwide are "able to speak the language", without specifying the criteria for this estimation or whom it encompasses. According to a demographic projection led by the Université Laval and the Réseau Démographie de l'Agence universitaire de la Francophonie, the total number of French speakers will reach approximately 500 million in 2025 and 650 million by 2050. OIF estimates 700 million by 2050, 80% of whom will be in Africa.

French has a long history as an international language of literature and scientific standards and is a primary or second language of many international organisations including the United Nations, the European Union, the North Atlantic Treaty Organization, the World Trade Organization, the International Olympic Committee, and the International Committee of the Red Cross. In 2011, Bloomberg Businessweek ranked French the third most useful language for business, after English and Standard Mandarin Chinese.

History

French is a Romance language (meaning that it is descended primarily from Vulgar Latin) that evolved out of the Gallo-Romance dialects spoken in northern France. The language's early forms include Old French and Middle French.

Vulgar Latin in Gaul 

Due to Roman rule, Latin was gradually adopted by the inhabitants of Gaul, and as the language was learned by the common people it developed a distinct local character, with grammatical differences from Latin as spoken elsewhere, some of which being attested on graffiti. This local variety evolved into the Gallo-Romance tongues, which include French and its closest relatives, such as Arpitan.

The evolution of Latin in Gaul was shaped by its coexistence for over half a millennium beside the native Celtic Gaulish language, which did not go extinct until the late sixth century, long after the fall of the Western Roman Empire. The population remained 90% indigenous in origin; the Romanizing class were the local native elite (not Roman settlers), whose children learned Latin in Roman schools. At the time of the collapse of the Empire, this local elite had been slowly abandoning Gaulish entirely, but the rural and lower class populations remained Gaulish speakers who could sometimes also speak Latin or Greek. The final language shift from Gaulish to Vulgar Latin among rural and lower class populations occurred later, when both they and the incoming Frankish ruler/military class adopted the Gallo-Roman Vulgar Latin speech of the urban intellectual elite.

The Gaulish language likely survived into the sixth century in France despite considerable Romanization. Coexisting with Latin, Gaulish helped shape the Vulgar Latin dialects that developed into French contributing loanwords and calques (including oui, the word for "yes"), sound changes shaped by Gaulish influence, and influences in conjugation and word order. Recent computational studies suggest that early gender shifts may have been motivated by the gender of the corresponding word in Gaulish.

The estimated number of French words that can be attributed to Gaulish is placed at 154 by the Petit Robert, which is often viewed as representing standardized French, while if non-standard dialects are included, the number increases to 240. Known Gaulish loans are skewed toward certain semantic fields, such as plant life (chêne, bille, etc.), animals (mouton, cheval, etc.), nature (boue, etc.), domestic activities (ex. berceau), farming and rural units of measure (arpent, lieue, borne, boisseau), weapons, and products traded regionally rather than further afield. This semantic distribution has been attributed to peasants being the last to hold onto Gaulish.

Old French 
The beginning of French in Gaul was greatly influenced by Germanic invasions into the country. These invasions had the greatest impact on the northern part of the country and on the language there. A language divide began to grow across the country. The population in the north spoke  while the population in the south spoke . Langue d'oïl grew into what is known as Old French. The period of Old French spanned between the 8th and 14th centuries. Old French shared many characteristics with Latin. For example, Old French made use of different possible word orders just as Latin did because it had a case system that retained the difference between nominative subjects and oblique non-subjects. The period is marked by a heavy superstrate influence from the Germanic Frankish language, which non-exhaustively included the use in upper-class speech and higher registers of V2 word order, a large percentage of the vocabulary (now at around 15% of modern French vocabulary) including the impersonal singular pronoun on (a calque of Germanic man), and the name of the language itself.

Up until its later stages, Old French, alongside Old Occitan, maintained a relic of the old nominal case system of Latin longer than most other Romance languages (with the notable exception of Romanian which still currently maintains a case distinction), differentiating between an oblique case and a nominative case. The phonology was characterized by heavy syllabic stress, which led to the emergence of various complicated diphthongs such as -eau which would later be leveled to monophthongs.

The earliest evidence of what became Old French can be seen in the Oaths of Strasbourg and the Sequence of Saint Eulalia, while Old French literature began to be produced in the eleventh century, with major early works often focusing on the lives of saints (such as the Vie de Saint Alexis), or wars and royal courts, notably including the Chanson de Roland, epic cycles focused on King Arthur and his court, as well as a cycle focused on William of Orange.

Middle French 

Within Old French many dialects emerged but the Francien dialect is one that not only continued but also thrived during the Middle French period (14th–17th centuries). Modern French grew out of this Francien dialect. Grammatically, during the period of Middle French, noun declensions were lost and there began to be standardized rules. Robert Estienne published the first Latin-French dictionary, which included information about phonetics, etymology, and grammar. Politically, the Ordinance of Villers-Cotterêts (1539) named French the language of law.

Modern French 
During the 17th century, French replaced Latin as the most important language of diplomacy and international relations (lingua franca). It retained this role until approximately the middle of the 20th century, when it was replaced by English as the United States became the dominant global power following the Second World War. Stanley Meisler of the Los Angeles Times said that the fact that the Treaty of Versailles was written in English as well as French was the "first diplomatic blow" against the language.

During the Grand Siècle (17th century), France, under the rule of powerful leaders such as Cardinal Richelieu and Louis XIV, enjoyed a period of prosperity and prominence among European nations. Richelieu established the Académie Française to protect the French language. By the early 1800s, Parisian French had become the primary language of the aristocracy in France.

Near the beginning of the 19th century, the French government began to pursue policies with the end goal of eradicating the many minorities and regional languages (patois) spoken in France. This began in 1794 with Henri Grégoire's "Report on the necessity and means to annihilate the patois and to universalize the use of the French language". When public education was made compulsory, only French was taught and the use of any other (patois) language was punished. The goals of the public school system were made especially clear to the French-speaking teachers sent to teach students in regions such as Occitania and Brittany. Instructions given by a French official to teachers in the department of Finistère, in western Brittany, included the following: "And remember, Gents: you were given your position in order to kill the Breton language". The prefect of Basses-Pyrénées in the French Basque Country wrote in 1846: "Our schools in the Basque Country are particularly meant to replace the Basque language with French..." Students were taught that their ancestral languages were inferior and they should be ashamed of them; this process was known in the Occitan-speaking region as Vergonha.

Geographic distribution

Europe

Spoken by 19.71% of the European Union's population, French is the third most widely spoken language in the EU, after English and German and the second-most-widely taught language after English.

Under the Constitution of France, French has been the official language of the Republic since 1992, although the Ordinance of Villers-Cotterêts made it mandatory for legal documents in 1539. France mandates the use of French in official government publications, public education except in specific cases, and legal contracts; advertisements must bear a translation of foreign words.

In Belgium, French is an official language at the federal level along with Dutch and German. At the regional level, French is the sole official language of Wallonia (excluding a part of the East Cantons, which are German-speaking) and one of the two official languages—along with Dutch—of the Brussels-Capital Region, where it is spoken by the majority of the population (approx. 80%), often as their primary language.

French is one of the four official languages of Switzerland, along with German, Italian, and Romansh, and is spoken in the western part of Switzerland, called Romandy, of which Geneva is the largest city. The language divisions in Switzerland do not coincide with political subdivisions, and some cantons have bilingual status: for example, cities such as Biel/Bienne and cantons such as Valais, Fribourg and Berne. French is the native language of about 23% of the Swiss population, and is spoken by 50% of the population.

Along with Luxembourgish and German, French is one of the three official languages of Luxembourg, where it is generally the preferred language of business as well as of the different public administrations. It is also the official language of Monaco.

At a regional level, French is acknowledged as an official language in the Aosta Valley region of Italy where it is the first language of approximately 30% of the population, while French dialects remain spoken by minorities on the Channel Islands. It is also spoken in Andorra and is the main language after Catalan in El Pas de la Casa. The language is taught as the primary second language in the German state of Saarland, with French being taught from pre-school and over 43% of citizens being able to speak French.

Africa

The majority of the world's French-speaking population lives in Africa. This number does not include the people living in non-Francophone African countries who have learned French as a foreign language. Due to the rise of French in Africa, the total French-speaking population worldwide is expected to reach 700 million people in 2050. French is the fastest growing language on the continent (in terms of either official or foreign languages).
French is mostly a second language in Africa, but it has become a first language in some urban areas, such as the region of Abidjan, Ivory Coast and in Libreville, Gabon. There is not a single African French, but multiple forms that diverged through contact with various indigenous African languages.

Sub-Saharan Africa is the region where the French language is most likely to expand, because of the expansion of education and rapid population growth. It is also where the language has evolved the most in recent years. Some vernacular forms of French in Africa can be difficult to understand for French speakers from other countries, but written forms of the language are very closely related to those of the rest of the French-speaking world.

Americas

Canada

French is the second-most common language in Canada, after English, and both are official languages at the federal level. It is the first language of 9.5 million people or 29% and the second language for 2.07 million or 6% of the entire population of Canada. French is the sole official language in the province of Quebec, being the mother tongue for some 7 million people, or almost 80% (2006 Census) of the province. About 95% of the people of Quebec speak French as either their first or second language, and for some as their third language. Quebec is also home to the city of Montreal, which is the world's fourth-largest French-speaking city, by number of first language speakers. New Brunswick and Manitoba are the only officially bilingual provinces, though full bilingualism is enacted only in New Brunswick, where about one third of the population is Francophone. French is also an official language of all of the territories (Northwest Territories, Nunavut, and Yukon). Out of the three, Yukon has the most French speakers, making up just under 4% of the population. Furthermore, while French is not an official language in Ontario, the French Language Services Act ensures that provincial services are to be available in the language. The Act applies to areas of the province where there are significant Francophone communities, namely Eastern Ontario and Northern Ontario. Elsewhere, sizable French-speaking minorities are found in southern Manitoba, Nova Scotia, Prince Edward Island and the Port au Port Peninsula in Newfoundland and Labrador, where the unique Newfoundland French dialect was historically spoken. Smaller pockets of French speakers exist in all other provinces. The Ontarian city of Ottawa, the Canadian capital, is also effectively bilingual, as it has a large population of federal government workers, who are required to offer services in both French and English, and is across a river from Quebec, opposite the major city of Gatineau with which it forms a single metropolitan area.

United States

According to the United States Census Bureau (2011), French is the fourth most spoken language in the United States after English, Spanish, and Chinese, when all forms of French are considered together and all dialects of Chinese are similarly combined. French is the second-most spoken language (after English) in the states of Maine and Vermont. In Louisiana, it is tied with Spanish for second-most spoken if Louisiana French and all creoles such as Haitian are included. French is the third most spoken language (after English and Spanish) in the states of Connecticut, Rhode Island, and New Hampshire. Louisiana is home to many distinct French dialects, collectively known as Louisiana French. New England French, essentially a variant of Canadian French, is spoken in parts of New England. Missouri French was historically spoken in Missouri and Illinois (formerly known as Upper Louisiana), but is nearly extinct today. French also survived in isolated pockets along the Gulf Coast of what was previously French Lower Louisiana, such as Mon Louis Island, Alabama and DeLisle, Mississippi (the latter only being discovered by linguists in the 1990s) but these varieties are severely endangered or presumed extinct.

Caribbean
French is one of two official languages in Haiti alongside Haitian Creole. It is the principal language of education, administration, business, and public signage and is spoken by all educated Haitians. It is also used for ceremonial events such as weddings, graduations, and church masses. The vast majority of the population speaks Haitian Creole as their first language; the rest largely speak French as a first language. As a French Creole language, Haitian Creole draws the large majority of its vocabulary from French, with influences from West African languages, as well as several European languages. It is closely related to Louisiana Creole and the creole from the Lesser Antilles.

French is the sole official language of all the overseas territories of France in the Caribbean that are collectively referred to as the French West Indies, namely Guadeloupe, Saint Barthélemy, Saint Martin, and Martinique.

Other territories
French is the official language of both French Guiana on the South American continent, and of Saint Pierre and Miquelon, an archipelago off the coast of Newfoundland in North America.

Asia

Southeast Asia

French was the official language of the colony of French Indochina, comprising modern-day Vietnam, Laos, and Cambodia. It continues to be an administrative language in Laos and Cambodia, although its influence has waned in recent decades. In colonial Vietnam, the elites primarily spoke French, while many servants who worked in French households spoke a French pidgin known as "Tây Bồi" (now extinct). After French rule ended, South Vietnam continued to use French in administration, education, and trade. However, since the Fall of Saigon and the opening of a unified Vietnam's economy, French has gradually been effectively displaced as the first foreign language of choice by English in Vietnam. Nevertheless, it continues to be taught as the other main foreign language in the Vietnamese educational system and is regarded as a cultural language.
All three countries are full members of La Francophonie (OIF).

India

French was the official language of French India, consisting of the geographically separate enclaves referred to as Puducherry. It continued to be an official language of the territory even after its cession to India in 1956 until 1965. A small number of older locals still retain knowledge of the language, although it has now given way to Tamil and English.

Western Asia

Lebanon

A former French mandate, Lebanon designates Arabic as the sole official language, while a special law regulates cases when French can be publicly used. Article 11 of Lebanon's Constitution states that "Arabic is the official national language. A law determines the cases in which the French language is to be used". The French language in Lebanon is a widespread second language among the Lebanese people, and is taught in many schools along with Arabic and English. French is used on Lebanese pound banknotes, on road signs, on Lebanese license plates, and on official buildings (alongside Arabic).

Today, French and English are secondary languages of Lebanon, with about 40% of the population being Francophone and 40% Anglophone. The use of English is growing in the business and media environment. Out of about 900,000 students, about 500,000 are enrolled in Francophone schools, public or private, in which the teaching of mathematics and scientific subjects is provided in French. Actual usage of French varies depending on the region and social status. One-third of high school students educated in French go on to pursue higher education in English-speaking institutions. English is the language of business and communication, with French being an element of social distinction, chosen for its emotional value.

United Arab Emirates and Qatar
The UAE has the status in the Organisation internationale de la Francophonie as an observer state, and Qatar has the status in the organization as an associate state. However, in both countries, French is not spoken by almost any of the general population or migrant workers, but spoken by a small minority of those who invest in Francophone countries or have other financial or family ties. Their entrance as observer and associate states respectively into the organization was aided a good deal by their investments into the Organisation and France itself. A country's status as an observer state in the Organisation internationale de la Francophonie gives the country the right to send representatives to organization meetings and make formal requests to the organization but they do not have voting rights within the OIF. A country's status as an associate state also does not give a country voting abilities but associate states can discuss and review organization matters.

Oceania and Australasia

French is an official language of the Pacific Island nation of Vanuatu, where 31% of the population was estimated to speak it in 2018. In the French special collectivity of New Caledonia, 97% of the population can speak, read and write French while in French Polynesia this figure is 95%, and in the French collectivity of Wallis and Futuna, it is 84%.

In French Polynesia and to a lesser extent Wallis and Futuna, where oral and written knowledge of the French language has become almost universal (95% and 84% respectively), French increasingly tends to displace the native Polynesian languages as the language most spoken at home. In French Polynesia, the percentage of the population who reported that French was the language they use the most at home rose from 67% at the 2007 census to 74% at the 2017 census. In Wallis and Futuna, the percentage of the population who reported that French was the language they use the most at home rose from 10% at the 2008 census to 13% at the 2018 census.

Future 
The future of the French language is often discussed in the news. For example, in 2014, The New York Times documented an increase in the teaching of French in New York, especially in K-12 dual-language programs where Spanish and Mandarin are the only second-language options more popular than French. In a study published in March 2014 by Forbes, the investment bank Natixis said that French could become the world's most spoken language by 2050. It noted that French is spreading in areas where the population is rapidly increasing, especially in sub-Saharan Africa.

In the European Union, French was the dominant language within all institutions until the 1990s. After several enlargements of the EU (1995, 2004), French significantly lost ground in favour of English, which is more widely spoken and taught in most EU countries. French currently remains one of the three working languages, or "procedural languages", of the EU, along with English and German. It is the second-most widely used language within EU institutions after English, but remains the preferred language of certain institutions or administrations such as the Court of Justice of the European Union, where it is the sole internal working language, or the Directorate-General for Agriculture. Since 2016, Brexit has rekindled discussions on whether or not French should again hold greater role within the institutions of the European Union.

Varieties

 African French
 Maghreb French (North African French)
 Aostan French
 Belgian French
 Cambodian French
 Canadian French
 Acadian French
 Newfoundland French
 New England French
 Ontario French
 Quebec French
 French French
 Guianese French
 Meridional French
 Haitian French
 Indian French
 Jersey Legal French
 Lao French
 Louisiana French
 Cajun French
 Missouri French
 South East Asian French
 Swiss French
 Vietnamese French
 West Indian French

Current status and importance
A leading world language, French is taught in universities around the world, and is one of the world's most influential languages because of its wide use in the worlds of journalism, jurisprudence, education, and diplomacy.
In diplomacy, French is one of the six official languages of the United Nations (and one of the UN Secretariat's only two working languages), one of twenty official and three procedural languages of the European Union, an official language of NATO, the International Olympic Committee, the Council of Europe, the Organisation for Economic Co-operation and Development, Organization of American States (alongside Spanish, Portuguese and English), the Eurovision Song Contest, one of eighteen official languages of the European Space Agency, World Trade Organization and the least used of the three official languages in the North American Free Trade Agreement countries. It is also a working language in nonprofit organisations such as the Red Cross (alongside English, German, Spanish, Portuguese, Arabic and Russian), Amnesty International (alongside 32 other languages of which English is the most used, followed by Spanish, Portuguese, German, and Italian), Médecins sans Frontières (used alongside English, Spanish, Portuguese and Arabic), and Médecins du Monde (used alongside English). Given the demographic prospects of the French-speaking nations of Africa, researcher Pascal-Emmanuel Gobry wrote in 2014 that French "could be the language of the future".

Significant as a judicial language, French is one of the official languages of such major international and regional courts, tribunals, and dispute-settlement bodies as the African Court on Human and Peoples' Rights, the Caribbean Court of Justice, the Court of Justice for the Economic Community of West African States, the Inter-American Court of Human Rights, the International Court of Justice, the International Criminal Tribunal for the former Yugoslavia, International Criminal Tribunal for Rwanda, the International Tribunal for the Law of the Sea the International Criminal Court and the World Trade Organization Appellate Body. It is the sole internal working language of the Court of Justice of the European Union, and makes with English the European Court of Human Rights's two working languages.

In 1997, George Weber published, in Language Today, a comprehensive academic study entitled "The World's 10 most influential languages". In the article, Weber ranked French as, after English, the second-most influential language of the world, ahead of Spanish. His criteria were the numbers of native speakers, the number of secondary speakers (especially high for French among fellow world languages), the number of countries using the language and their respective populations, the economic power of the countries using the language, the number of major areas in which the language is used, and the linguistic prestige associated with the mastery of the language (Weber highlighted that French in particular enjoys considerable linguistic prestige). In a 2008 reassessment of his article, Weber concluded that his findings were still correct since "the situation among the top ten remains unchanged."

Knowledge of French is often considered to be a useful skill by business owners in the United Kingdom; a 2014 study found that 50% of British managers considered French to be a valuable asset for their business, thus ranking French as the most sought-after foreign language there, ahead of German (49%) and Spanish (44%). MIT economist Albert Saiz calculated a 2.3% premium for those who have French as a foreign language in the workplace.

In English-speaking Canada, the United Kingdom, and Ireland, French is the first foreign language taught and in number of pupils is far ahead of other languages. In the United States, French is the second-most commonly taught foreign language in schools and universities, although well behind Spanish. In some areas of the country near French-speaking Quebec, however, it is the foreign language more commonly taught.

Phonology

Vowel phonemes in French

Although there are many French regional accents, foreign learners normally use only one variety of the language.

 Voiced stops (i.e.) are typically produced fully voiced throughout.
 Voiceless stops (i.e.) are unaspirated.
 The velar nasal  can occur in final position in borrowed (usually English) words: parking, camping, swing. The palatal nasal  can occur in word initial position (e.g., gnon), but it is most frequently found in intervocalic, onset position or word-finally (e.g., montagne).
 French has three pairs of homorganic fricatives distinguished by voicing, i.e., labiodental , dental , and palato-alveolar .  are dental, like the plosives  and the nasal .
 French has one rhotic whose pronunciation varies considerably among speakers and phonetic contexts. Vowels are often lengthened before this segment. It can be reduced to an approximant, particularly in final position (e.g., fort), or reduced to zero in some word-final positions. For other speakers, a uvular trill is also common, and an apical trill  occurs in some dialects.
 Lateral and central approximants: The lateral approximant  is unvelarised in both onset (lire) and coda position (il). There are a few minimal pairs where the approximant and corresponding vowel contrast, but there are also many cases where they are in free variation.

French pronunciation follows strict rules based on spelling, but French spelling is often based more on history than phonology. The rules for pronunciation vary between dialects, but the standard rules are:
 Final single consonants, in particular s, x, z, t, d, n, p and g, are normally silent. (A consonant is considered "final" when no vowel follows it even if one or more consonants follow it.) The final letters f, k, q, and l, however, are normally pronounced. The final c is sometimes pronounced like in bac, sac, roc but can also be silent like in blanc or estomac. The final r is usually silent when it follows an e in a word of two or more syllables, but it is pronounced in some words (hiver, super, cancer etc.).
 When the following word begins with a vowel, however, a silent consonant may once again be pronounced, to provide a liaison or "link" between the two words. Some liaisons are mandatory, for example the s in les amants or vous avez; some are optional, depending on dialect and register, for example, the first s in deux cents euros or euros irlandais; and some are forbidden, for example, the s in beaucoup d'hommes aiment. The t of et is never pronounced and the silent final consonant of a noun is only pronounced in the plural and in set phrases like pied-à-terre.
 Doubling a final n and adding a silent e at the end of a word (e.g., chien → chienne) makes it clearly pronounced. Doubling a final l and adding a silent e (e.g., gentil → gentille) adds a [j] sound if the l is preceded by the letter i.
 Some monosyllabic function words ending in a or e, such as je and que, drop their final vowel when placed before a word that begins with a vowel sound (thus avoiding a hiatus). The missing vowel is replaced by an apostrophe. (e.g., *je ai is instead pronounced and spelled → j'ai). This gives, for example, the same pronunciation for l'homme qu'il a vu ("the man whom he saw") and l'homme qui l'a vu ("the man who saw him"). However, for Belgian French the sentences are pronounced differently; in the first sentence the syllable break is as "qu'il-a", while the second breaks as "qui-l'a". It can also be noted that, in Quebec French, the second example (l'homme qui l'a vu) is more emphasized on l'a vu.

Writing system

Alphabet

French is written with the 26 letters of the basic Latin script, with four diacritics appearing on vowels (circumflex accent, acute accent, grave accent, diaeresis) and the cedilla appearing in "ç".

There are two ligatures, "œ" and "æ", but they are often replaced in contemporary French with "oe" and "ae", because the ligatures do not appear on the AZERTY keyboard layout used in French-speaking countries. However this is nonstandard in formal and literary texts.

Orthography

French spelling, like English spelling, tends to preserve obsolete pronunciation rules. This is mainly due to extreme phonetic changes since the Old French period, without a corresponding change in spelling. Moreover, some conscious changes were made to restore Latin orthography (as with some English words such as "debt"):
 Old French doit > French doigt "finger" (Latin digitus)
 Old French pie > French pied "foot" [Latin pes (stem: ped-)]

French orthography is morphophonemic. While it contains 130 graphemes that denote only 36 phonemes, many of its spelling rules are likely due to a consistency in morphemic patterns such as adding suffixes and prefixes. Many given spellings of common morphemes usually lead to a predictable sound. In particular, a given vowel combination or diacritic generally leads to one phoneme. However, there is not a one-to-one relation of a phoneme and a single related grapheme, which can be seen in how tomber and tombé both end with the /e/ phoneme. Additionally, there are many variations in the pronunciation of consonants at the end of words, demonstrated by how the x in paix is not pronounced though at the end of Aix it is.

As a result, it can be difficult to predict the spelling of a word based on the sound. Final consonants are generally silent, except when the following word begins with a vowel (see Liaison (French)). For example, the following words end in a vowel sound: pied, aller, les, beaux. The same words followed by a vowel, however, may sound the consonants, as they do in these examples: beaux-arts, les amis, pied-à-terre.

French writing, as with any language, is affected by the spoken language. In Old French, the plural for animal was animals. The  sequence was unstable and was turned into a diphthong . This change was then reflected in the orthography: animaus. The us ending, very common in Latin, was then abbreviated by copyists (monks) by the letter x, resulting in a written form animax. As the French language further evolved, the pronunciation of au turned into  so that the u was reestablished in orthography for consistency, resulting in modern French animaux (pronounced first  before the final  was dropped in contemporary French). The same is true for cheval pluralized as chevaux and many others. In addition, castel pl. castels became château pl. châteaux.
 Nasal: n and m. When n or m follows a vowel or diphthong, the n or m becomes silent and causes the preceding vowel to become nasalized (i.e., pronounced with the soft palate extended downward so as to allow part of the air to leave through the nostrils). Exceptions are when the n or m is doubled, or immediately followed by a vowel. The prefixes en- and em- are always nasalized. The rules are more complex than this but may vary between dialects.
 Digraphs: French uses not only diacritics to specify its large range of vowel sounds and diphthongs, but also specific combinations of vowels, sometimes with following consonants, to show which sound is intended.
 Gemination: Within words, double consonants are generally not pronounced as geminates in modern French (but geminates can be heard in the cinema or TV news from as recently as the 1970s, and in very refined elocution they may still occur). For example, illusion is pronounced  and not . However, gemination does occur between words; for example, une info ("a news item" or "a piece of information") is pronounced , whereas une nympho ("a nymphomaniac") is pronounced .
 Accents are used sometimes for pronunciation, sometimes to distinguish similar words, and sometimes based on etymology alone.
 Accents that affect pronunciation
 The acute accent (l'accent aigu) é (e.g., école—school) means that the vowel is pronounced  instead of the default .
 The grave accent (l'accent grave) è (e.g., élève—pupil) means that the vowel is pronounced  instead of the default .
 The circumflex (l'accent circonflexe) ê (e.g. forêt—forest) shows that an e is pronounced  and that an ô is pronounced . In the mid-18th century, the circumflex was used in place of s after a vowel, where that letter s was not pronounced. Thus, forest became forêt, hospital became hôpital, and hostel became hôtel.
 Diaeresis or tréma (ë, ï, ü, ÿ): over e, i, u or y, indicates that a vowel is to be pronounced separately from the preceding one: naïve, Noël.
The combination of e with diaeresis following o (Noël ) is nasalized in the regular way if followed by n (Samoëns )
The combination of e with diaeresis following a is either pronounced  (Raphaël, Israël ) or not pronounced, leaving only the a (Staël ) and the a is nasalized in the regular way if aë is followed by n (Saint-Saëns )
A diaeresis on y only occurs in some proper names and in modern editions of old French texts. Some proper names in which ÿ appears include Aÿ (a commune in Marne, formerly Aÿ-Champagne), Rue des Cloÿs (an alley in Paris), Croÿ (family name and hotel on the Boulevard Raspail, Paris),  (near Pontoise), Ghÿs (name of Flemish origin spelt Ghĳs where ĳ in handwriting looked like ÿ to French clerks), L'Haÿ-les-Roses (commune near Paris), Pierre Louÿs (author), Moÿ-de-l'Aisne (commune in Aisne and a family name), and Le Blanc de Nicolaÿ (an insurance company in eastern France).
The diaeresis on u appears in the Biblical proper names Archélaüs, Capharnaüm, Emmaüs, Ésaü, and Saül, as well as French names such as Haüy. Nevertheless, since the 1990 orthographic changes, the diaeresis in words containing guë (such as aiguë or ciguë) may be moved onto the u: aigüe, cigüe, and by analogy may be used in verbs such as j'argüe.
In addition, words coming from German retain their umlaut (ä, ö and ü) if applicable but use often French pronunciation, such as Kärcher (trademark of a pressure washer).
 The cedilla (la cédille) ç (e.g., garçon—boy) means that the letter ç is pronounced  in front of the back vowels a, o and u (c is otherwise  before a back vowel). C is always pronounced  in front of the front vowels e, i, and y, thus ç is never found in front of front vowels.
 Accents with no pronunciation effect
 The circumflex does not affect the pronunciation of the letters i or u, nor, in most dialects, a. It usually indicates that an s came after it long ago, as in île (from former isle, compare with English word "isle"). The explanation is that some words share the same orthography, so the circumflex is put here to mark the difference between the two words. For example, dites (you say) / dîtes (you said), or even du (of the) / dû (past participle for the verb devoir = must, have to, owe; in this case, the circumflex disappears in the plural and the feminine).
 All other accents are used only to distinguish similar words, as in the case of distinguishing the adverbs là and où ("there", "where") from the article la ("the" feminine singular) and the conjunction ou ("or"), respectively.

Some proposals exist to simplify the existing writing system, but they still fail to gather interest.

In 1990, a reform accepted some changes to French orthography. At the time the proposed changes were considered to be suggestions. In 2016, schoolbooks in France began to use the newer recommended spellings, with instruction to teachers that both old and new spellings be deemed correct.

Grammar

French is a moderately inflected language. Nouns and most pronouns are inflected for number (singular or plural, though in most nouns the plural is pronounced the same as the singular even if spelled differently); adjectives, for number and gender (masculine or feminine) of their nouns; personal pronouns and a few other pronouns, for person, number, gender, and case; and verbs, for tense, aspect, mood, and the person and number of their subjects. Case is primarily marked using word order and prepositions, while certain verb features are marked using auxiliary verbs. According to the French lexicogrammatical system, French has a rank-scale hierarchy with clause as the top rank, which is followed by group rank, word rank, and morpheme rank. A French clause is made up of groups, groups are made up of words, and lastly, words are made up of morphemes.

French grammar shares several notable features with most other Romance languages, including
 the loss of Latin declensions
 the loss of the neuter gender
 the development of grammatical articles from Latin demonstratives
 the loss of certain Latin tenses and the creation of new tenses from auxiliaries.

Nouns 
Every French noun is either masculine or feminine. Because French nouns are not inflected for gender, a noun's form cannot specify its gender. For nouns regarding the living, their grammatical genders often correspond to that which they refer to. For example, a male teacher is an "enseignant" while a female teacher is an "enseignante". However, plural nouns that refer to a group that includes both masculine and feminine entities are always masculine. So a group of two male teachers would be "enseignants". A group of two male teachers and two female teachers would still be "enseignants". In many situations, and in the case of "enseignant", both the singular and plural form of a noun are pronounced identically. The article used for singular nouns is different from that used for plural nouns and the article provides a distinguishing factor between the two in speech. For example, the singular "le professeur" or "la professeur(e)" (the male or female teacher, professor) can be distinguished from the plural "les professeurs" because "le", "la", and "les" are all pronounced differently. There are some situations where both the feminine and masculine form of a noun are the same and the article provides the only difference. For example, "le dentiste" refers to a male dentist while "la dentiste" refers to a female dentist.

Verbs

Moods and tense-aspect forms 
The French language consists of both finite and non-finite moods. The finite moods include the indicative mood (indicatif), the subjunctive mood (subjonctif), the imperative mood (impératif), and the conditional mood (conditionnel). The non-finite moods include the infinitive mood (infinitif), the present participle (participe présent), and the past participle (participe passé).

Finite moods

Indicative (Indicatif) 
The indicative mood makes use of eight tense-aspect forms. These include the present (présent), the simple past (passé composé and passé simple), the past imperfective (imparfait), the pluperfect (plus-que-parfait), the simple future (futur simple), the future perfect (futur antérieur), and the past perfect (passé antérieur). Some forms are less commonly used today. In today's spoken French, the passé composé is used while the passé simple is reserved for formal situations or for literary purposes. Similarly, the plus-que-parfait is used for speaking rather than the older passé antérieur seen in literary works.

Within the indicative mood, the passé composé, plus-que-parfait, futur antérieur, and passé antérieur all use auxiliary verbs in their forms.

Subjunctive (Subjonctif) 
The subjunctive mood only includes four of the tense-aspect forms found in the indicative: present (présent), simple past (passé composé), past imperfective (imparfait), and pluperfect (plus-que-parfait).

Within the subjunctive mood, the passé composé and plus-que-parfait use auxiliary verbs in their forms.

Imperative (Imperatif) 
The imperative is used in the present tense (with the exception of a few instances where it is used in the perfect tense). The imperative is used to give commands to you (tu), we/us (nous), and plural you (vous).

Conditional (Conditionnel) 
The conditional makes use of the present (présent) and the past (passé).

The passé uses auxiliary verbs in its forms.

Voice 
French uses both the active voice and the passive voice. The active voice is unmarked while the passive voice is formed by using a form of verb être ("to be") and the past participle.

Example of the active voice:
 "Elle aime le chien." She loves the dog.
 "Marc a conduit la voiture." Marc drove the car.
Example of the passive voice:
 "Le chien est aimé par elle." The dog is loved by her.
 "La voiture a été conduite par Marc." The car was driven by Marc.

Syntax

Word order 
French declarative word order is subject–verb–object although a pronoun object precedes the verb. Some types of sentences allow for or require different word orders, in particular inversion of the subject and verb, as in "Parlez-vous français ?" when asking a question rather than "Vous parlez français ?" Both formulations are used, and carry a rising inflection on the last word. The literal English translations are "Do you speak French?" and "You speak French?", respectively. To avoid inversion while asking a question, "Est-ce que" (literally "is it that") may be placed at the beginning of the sentence. "Parlez-vous français ?" may become "Est-ce que vous parlez français ?" French also uses verb–object–subject (VOS) and object–subject–verb (OSV) word order. OSV word order is not used often and VOS is reserved for formal writings.

Vocabulary

The majority of French words derive from Vulgar Latin or were constructed from Latin or Greek roots. In many cases, a single etymological root appears in French in a "popular" or native form, inherited from Vulgar Latin, and a learned form, borrowed later from Classical Latin. The following pairs consist of a native noun and a learned adjective:
 brother: frère / fraternel from Latin frater / fraternalis
 finger: doigt / digital from Latin digitus / digitalis
 faith: foi / fidèle from Latin fides / fidelis
 eye: œil / oculaire from Latin oculus / ocularis

However, a historical tendency to Gallicise Latin roots can be identified, whereas English conversely leans towards a more direct incorporation of the Latin:
 rayonnement / radiation from Latin radiatio
 éteindre / extinguish from Latin exstinguere
 noyau / nucleus from Latin nucleus
 ensoleillement / insolation from Latin insolatio

There are also noun-noun and adjective-adjective pairs:
 thing/cause: chose / cause from Latin causa
 cold: froid / frigide from Latin frigidum

It can be difficult to identify the Latin source of native French words because in the evolution from Vulgar Latin, unstressed syllables were severely reduced and the remaining vowels and consonants underwent significant modifications.

More recently the linguistic policy of the French language academies of France and Quebec has been to provide French equivalents to (mainly English) imported words, either by using existing vocabulary, extending its meaning or deriving a new word according to French morphological rules. The result is often two (or more) co-existing terms for describing the same phenomenon.
 mercatique / marketing
 finance fantôme / shadow banking
 bloc-notes / notepad
 ailière / wingsuit
 tiers-lieu / coworking

It is estimated that 12% (4,200) of common French words found in a typical dictionary such as the Petit Larousse or Micro-Robert Plus (35,000 words) are of foreign origin (where Greek and Latin learned words are not seen as foreign). About 25% (1,054) of these foreign words come from English and are fairly recent borrowings. The others are some 707 words from Italian, 550 from ancient Germanic languages, 481 from other Gallo-Romance languages, 215 from Arabic, 164 from German, 160 from Celtic languages, 159 from Spanish, 153 from Dutch, 112 from Persian and Sanskrit, 101 from Native American languages, 89 from other Asian languages, 56 from other Afro-Asiatic languages, 55 from Balto-Slavic languages, 10 from Basque and 144 (about 3%) from other languages.

One study analyzing the degree of differentiation of Romance languages in comparison to Latin estimated that among the languages analyzed French has the greatest distance from Latin. Lexical similarity is 89% with Italian, 80% with Sardinian, 78% with Rhaeto-Romance, and 75% with Romanian, Spanish and Portuguese.

Numerals
The numeral system used in the majority of Francophone countries employs both decimal and vigesimal counting. After the use of unique names for the numbers 1-16, those from 17 to 69 are counted by tens, while  twenty is used as a base number in the names of numbers from 70 to 99. The vigesimal method of counting is analogous to the archaic English use of score, as in "fourscore and seven" (87), or "threescore and ten" (70).

The Aosta Valley similarly uses  for 80. Conversely, Belgium and in its former African colonies use quatre-vingts for 80.

In Old French (during the Middle Ages), all numbers from 30 to 99 could be said in either base 10 or base 20, e.g. vint et doze (twenty and twelve) for 32, dous vinz et diz (two twenties and ten) for 50, uitante for 80, or nonante for 90.

The term octante was historically used in Switzerland for 80, but is now considered archaic. 

French, like most European languages, uses a space to separate thousands. The comma is used in French numbers as a decimal point, i.e. "2,5" instead of "2.5". In the case of currencies, the currency markers are substituted for decimal point, i.e. "5$7" for "5 dollars and 7 cents".

Example text 
Article 1 of the Universal Declaration of Human Rights in French:
Tous les êtres humains naissent libres et égaux en dignité et en droits. Ils sont doués de raison et de conscience et doivent agir les uns envers les autres dans un esprit de fraternité.

Article 1 of the Universal Declaration of Human Rights in English:
All human beings are born free and equal in dignity and rights. They are endowed with reason and conscience and should act towards one another in a spirit of brotherhood.

See also

 Alliance Française
 AZERTY
 Français fondamental
 Francization
 Francophile
 Francophobia
 Francophonie
 French language in the United States
 French language in Canada
 French poetry
 Glossary of French expressions in English
 Influence of French on English
 Language education
 List of countries where French is an official language
 List of English words of French origin
 List of French loanwords in Persian
 List of French words and phrases used by English speakers
 List of German words of French origin
 Official bilingualism in Canada
 Varieties of French

Notes

References

Further reading
 
 Nadeau, Jean-Benoît, and Julie Barlow (2006). The Story of French. (First U.S. ed.) New York: St. Martin's Press. .
 Ursula Reutner (2017). Manuel des francophonies. Berlin/Boston: de Gruyter. .

External links

Organisations
 Fondation Alliance française: an international organisation for the promotion of French language and culture 
 Agence de promotion du FLE: Agency for promoting French as a foreign language

Courses and tutorials
 Français interactif: interactive French program, University of Texas at Austin
 Tex's French Grammar, University of Texas at Austin
 Lingopolo French
 French lessons in London, The Language machine

Online dictionaries
 Oxford Dictionaries French Dictionary
 Collins Online English↔French Dictionary
 Centre national de ressources textuelles et lexicales: monolingual dictionaries (including the Trésor de la langue française), language corpora, etc.

Grammar

Verbs 
 French verb conjugation at Verbix

Vocabulary
 Swadesh list in English and French

Numbers

Books
  La langue française dans le monde 2010 (Full book freely accessible)

Articles
 "The status of French in the world". Ministry of Foreign Affairs (France)

 
Articles containing video clips
Fusional languages
Languages attested from the 9th century
Languages of France
Languages of Algeria
Languages of Belgium
Languages of Benin
Languages of Burkina Faso
Languages of Burundi
Languages of Cambodia
Languages of Cameroon
Languages of Canada
Languages of the Central African Republic
Languages of Chad
Languages of the Comoros
Languages of the Republic of the Congo
Languages of the Democratic Republic of the Congo
Languages of Djibouti
Languages of French Guiana
Languages of French Polynesia
Languages of Gabon
Languages of Guadeloupe
Languages of Guinea
Languages of Haiti
Languages of Ivory Coast
Languages of Laos
Languages of Lebanon
Languages of Luxembourg
Languages of Madagascar
Languages of Mali
Languages of Martinique
Languages of Mauritania
Languages of Mauritius
Languages of Monaco
Languages of Morocco
Languages of New Caledonia
Languages of Niger
Languages of Réunion
Languages of Rwanda
Languages of Saint Martin (island)
Languages of Senegal
Languages of Seychelles
Languages of Switzerland
Languages of Togo
Languages of Tunisia
Languages of the United States
Languages of Vanuatu
Languages of Vietnam
Languages of Wallis and Futuna
Lingua francas
Subject–verb–object languages